Creobroter fasciatus is a species of praying mantis in the family Hymenopodidae.

See also
List of mantis genera and species

References

F
Mantodea of Asia
Fauna of Western Asia
Insects described in 1927